Polygyriscus is a genus of minute air-breathing land snails, terrestrial pulmonate gastropod mollusks in the family Polygyridae. This is a  monotypic genus of snails containing the single species Polygyriscus virginianus, known commonly as the Virginia fringed mountain snail or the Virginia coil. That species is endemic to the State of Virginia in the United States.

The Virginia coil was listed as federally endangered species on 2 August 1978.

This snail was described in 1947. It is very rare; the snail has only been seen on bluffs along the New River in Pulaski County, Virginia. Only four adult specimens have been observed since 1978, and no juveniles have been seen since 1971. The snail is, however, difficult to find because it is only 3/20 in. long and may burrow up to 6 feet into the soil.

References

External links

Polygyridae
Natural history of Virginia
Pulaski County, Virginia
Monotypic mollusc genera
Gastropods described in 1947
Taxonomy articles created by Polbot
ESA endangered species

pt:Polygyriscus